China–Japan relations or Sino–Japanese relations are the bilateral relations between China and Japan. The countries are geographically separated by the East China Sea. Japan has been strongly influenced throughout its history by China, especially by the East and Southeast through the gradual process of Sinicization with its language, architecture, culture, cuisine, religion, philosophy, and law. When Japan was forced to open trade relations with the West after the Perry Expedition in the mid-19th century, Japan plunged itself through an active process of Westernization during the Meiji Restoration in 1868 and began viewing China under the Qing dynasty as an antiquated civilization unable to defend itself against foreign forces—in part due to the First and Second Opium Wars along with the Eight-Nation Alliance's involvement in suppressing the Boxer Rebellion. Japan eventually took advantage of such weaknesses by invading China, including the First Sino-Japanese War and the Second Sino-Japanese War.

According to the Chinese government, the relationship between China and Japan has been strained at times by Japan's refusal to acknowledge its wartime crimes to the satisfaction of China. According to the Japanese government, the cause of such strained relations is instead the expansion and assertive actions of the People's Liberation Army. Revisionist comments and visits to the Yasukuni Shrine by prominent Japanese officials, as well as some Japanese history textbooks regarding the 1937 Nanking massacre, have been a focus of particular controversy. Sino-Japanese relations warmed considerably after Shinzō Abe became the Prime Minister of Japan in September 2006, and a joint historical study conducted by China and Japan released a report in 2010 which pointed toward a new consensus on the issue of Japanese war crimes. The Senkaku Islands dispute also resulted in a number of hostile encounters in the East China Sea, heated rhetoric, and protests in China and Taiwan.

China's and Japan's economies are respectively the world's second and third-largest economies by nominal GDP and the first and fourth-largest economies by GDP PPP. In 2008, China-Japan trade grew to $266.4 billion, a rise of 12.5 percent on 2007, making China and Japan the top two-way trading partners. China was also the biggest destination for Japanese exports in 2009. Since the end of World War II, Sino-Japanese relations are still mired with geopolitical disagreements. The enmity between these two countries emanated from the history of the Japanese war and the imperialism and maritime disputes in the East China Sea. Thus, although these two nations are close business partners, there is an undercurrent of tension, which leaders of both sides are trying to quell. Chinese and Japanese leaders have met several times face to face to try to build a cordial relationship between the two countries.

Despite the disagreements, China and Japan have been steadily improving their relationships, with both sides remarking that they will be focusing on developing healthy ties, signalling towards a "new start". Both countries have started to cooperate in numerous areas, including boosting global trade and Asia's economic activities, working hand-in-hand on One Belt One Road Initiative, setting up maritime and air contact system for better communication, as well as holding several high level meetings and consultations. In 2018, the two countries pledged to further deepen ties and shares a common ground on the trade war, with Shinzō Abe saying that "Japan–China relations have been moving in the direction of great improvement". In 2022, China and Japan commemorated the 50th anniversary of the normalization of relations between their two nations.

Country comparison

Leaders of the two countries (since 1972; Shōwa period)

Leaders of the two countries (Heisei period)

Leaders of the two countries (Reiwa period)

History

Before 1949

China and Japan are geographically separated only by a relatively narrow stretch of ocean. China has strongly influenced Japan with its writing system, architecture, culture, religion, philosophy, and law. When Western countries forced Japan to open trading in the mid-19th century, Japan moved towards modernization (Meiji Restoration), viewing China as an antiquated civilization, unable to defend itself against Western forces in part due to the First and Second Opium Wars along with the Eight-Nation Alliance's involvement in suppressing the Boxer Rebellion. Japan's long chain of invasions and war crimes in China between 1894 and 1945 as well as modern Japan's attitude towards its past are major issues affecting current Sino-Japanese relations.

1950s
After the establishment of the People's Republic of China (PRC) in 1949, relations with Japan changed from hostility and an absence of contact to cordiality and extremely close cooperation in many fields. Japan was defeated and Japanese military power dismantled but the PRC continued to view Japan as a potential threat because of the presence of United States Forces Japan in the region. One of the recurring PRC's concerns in Sino-Japanese relations has been the potential re-militarization of Japan. On the other hand, some Japanese fear that the economic and military power of the PRC has been increasing (cf. Potential superpowers#China).

The Sino-Soviet Treaty of Friendship, Alliance and Mutual Assistance included the provision that each side would protect the other from an attack by "Japan or any state allied with it" and the PRC undoubtedly viewed with alarm Japan's role as the principal US military base during the Korean War. The Treaty of Mutual Cooperation and Security between the United States and Japan signed in 1951 also heightened the discouragement of diplomatic relations between the two countries. In 1952 Japan pushed dissension between the two countries even further by concluding a peace treaty with the ROC (Republic of China, or Taiwan) and establishing diplomatic relations with the Taiwanese authorities.

Like most Western nations at the time, Japan had recognized Taipei as the sole legitimate Chinese government. Initially, neither country allowed its political differences to stand in the way of broadening unofficial contacts, and in the mid-1950s they exchanged an increasing number of cultural, labor, and business delegations.

Although all these things complicated the relationship between the two countries, Beijing orchestrated relations with Japanese non-governmental organizations (NGO) through primarily the Chinese People’s Institute of Foreign Affairs (CPIFA).  The CPIFA would receive Japanese politicians from all parties, but the Japanese left-wing parties were more interested in the PRC's initiatives.  In 1952, the Chinese Commission for the Promotion of International Trade (CCPIT) was able to get a trade agreement signed by the Japanese Diet members. Liao Chengzhi, the deputy director of the State Council's Office of Foreign Affairs, was able to arrange many other agreements "such as the repatriation of Japanese prisoners of war with the Japanese Red Cross (1954), and the Fishery Agreement with the Japan-China Fishery Association (1955)."
During this time, the relationship between the two countries were primarily unofficial. The agreements were essential in bringing together a more amalgamated environment.

The PRC began a policy of attempting to influence the Japan through trade, "people's diplomacy", contacts with Japanese opposition political parties, and through applying pressure on Tokyo to sever ties with Taipei. In 1958, however, the PRC suspended its trade with Japan—apparently convinced that trade concessions were ineffective in achieving political goals. Thereafter, in a plan for improving political relations, the PRC requested that the Japanese government not be hostile toward it, not obstruct any effort to restore normal relations between itself and Japan, and not join in any conspiracy to create two Chinas.  After the Sino-Soviet break, economic necessity caused the PRC to reconsider and revitalize trade ties with Japan.

1960s
The Soviet Union suddenly withdrew Soviet experts from the PRC in the 1960s, which resulted in an economic dilemma for the PRC. The PRC was left with few options, one of which was to have a more official relationship with Japan.

Tatsunosuke Takasaki, member of the Liberal Democratic Party (LDP) and of the Diet and Director of the Economic Planning Agency of the Japanese, went to the PRC in order to sign a memorandum that would further the trade relations between the two countries, better known as the Liao-Takasaki Agreement. Under its terms, Chinese purchases of industrial plants were to be financed partly through medium-term credits from Japan Export-Import Bank (JEXIM). The accord also permitted the PRC to open a trade mission in Tokyo and in 1963 paved the way for Japanese government approval of the export to mainland China of a synthetic textile manufacturing plant valued at around US$ 20 million, guaranteed by the bank. Subsequent protest from the ROC caused Japan to shelve further deferred-payment plant exports. The PRC reacted to this change by downgrading its Japan trade and intensified propaganda attacks against Japan as a "running dog" (Chinese:"走狗") of the United States.
Behind the United States of America, China and Japan take the second and the third position respectively of the largest economies in the world. China and Japan trade approximately $350 billion worth of goods annually with each other (Xing, 2011). This is a huge exchange meaning that the trade ties between these two nations are one of the largest trading partnerships around the world. Economic studies reveal that the economic relationship between China and Japan started a long time ago when China started to import industrial goods to build its manufacturing infrastructure (Fuhrmann, 2016). Some of the goods that were imported include; machinery, equipment, steel mills, and the transportation infrastructure such as bridges, railways, roads and airports. Reports reveal that China major imports these goods from Japan and Germany.

Sino-Japanese ties declined again during the Cultural Revolution, and the decline was further exacerbated by Japan's growing strength and independence from the United States in the late 1960s. The PRC was especially concerned that Japan might remilitarize to compensate for the reduced US military presence in Asia brought about under president Richard Nixon. As the turmoil subsided, however, the Japanese government– already under pressure both from the pro-Beijing factions in the LDP and from opposition elements– sought to adopt a more forward posture.

1970s
In December 1971, the Chinese and Japanese trade liaison offices began to discuss the possibility of restoring diplomatic trade relations, and in July 1972, Kakuei Tanaka succeeded Eisaku Satō as a new Japanese Prime Minister. Tanaka assumed a normalization of the Sino-Japanese relations. Furthermore, the 1972 Nixon visit to China encouraged the normalization process. The normalization process was eased in part because China and Japan had maintained unofficial trade and people-to-people exchanges.

A visit by Tanaka to Beijing culminated in the signing a joint statement on September 29, 1972. It normalized diplomatic relations between Japan and the PRC. Japan stated that it was aware of its responsibility for causing enormous damage to the Chinese people during World War II and China renounced its demand for war reparation from Japan. Avoiding political disputes over this traumatic history facilitated immediate strategic cooperation.  The Japanese agreed with the Chinese view on the political status of Taiwan, namely "that Taiwan is an inalienable part of the territory of the People's Republic of China." Subsequently, the bilateral economic relationships grew rapidly: 28 Japanese and 30 Chinese economic and trade missions visited their partner country.

The joint communiqué says:

 The abnormal state of affairs that has hitherto existed between Japan and the People's Republic of China is terminated on the date on which this Joint Communique is issued.
 The Government of Japan recognizes that Government of the People's Republic of China as the sole legal Government of China.
 The Government of the People's Republic of China reiterates that Taiwan is an inalienable part of the territory of the People's Republic of China. The Government of Japan fully understands and respects this stand of the Government of the People's Republic of China, and it firmly maintains its stand under Article 8 of the Potsdam Proclamation.
 The Government of Japan and the Government of People's Republic of China have decided to establish diplomatic relations as from September 29, 1972. The two Governments have decided to take all necessary measures for the establishment and the performance of the functions of each other's embassy in their respective capitals in accordance with international law and practice, and to exchange ambassadors as speedily as possible.
 The Government of the People's Republic of China declares that in the interest of the friendship between the Chinese and the Japanese peoples, it renounces its demand for war reparation from Japan.
 The Government of Japan and the Government of the People's Republic of China agree to establish relations of perpetual peace and friendship between the two countries on the basis of the principles of mutual respect for sovereignty and territorial integrity, mutual non-aggression, non-interference in each other's internal affairs, equality and mutual benefit and peaceful co-existence. The two Governments confirm that, in conformity with the foregoing principles and the principles of the Charter of the United Nations, Japan and China shall in their mutual relations settle all disputes by peaceful means and shall refrain from the use or threat of force.
 The normalization of relations between Japan and China is not directed against any third country. Neither of the two countries should seek hegemony in the Asia-Pacific region and each is opposed to efforts by any other country or group of countries to establish such hegemony.
 The Government of Japan and the Government of the People's Republic of China have agreed that, with a view to solidifying and developing the relations of peace and friendship between the two countries, the two Governments will enter into negotiations for the purpose of concluding a treaty of peace and friendship.
 The Government of Japan and the Government of the People's Republic of China have agreed that, with a view to further promoting relations between the two countries and to expanding interchanges of people, the two Governments will, as necessary and taking account of the existing non-governmental arrangements, enter into negotiations for the purpose of concluding agreements concerning such matters as trade, shipping, aviation, and fisheries.

On 5 February 1973, the PRC and Japan agreed to reestablish diplomatic relations. Negotiations for a Sino-Japanese peace and friendship treaty began in 1974, but soon broken off in September 1975. The PRC insisted the anti-hegemony clause, which was directed at the Soviet Union, be included in the treaty. Japan objected the clause and did not wish to get involved in the Sino-Soviet split.

However, the death of Mao Zedong in 1976 brought economic reform to the PRC, which led to the expected Japanese investment in the Chinese economy.

In February 1978, a long-term private trade agreement led to an arrangement by which trade between Japan and the PRC would increase to a level of US$20 billion by 1985, through exports from Japan of plants and equipment, technology, construction materials, and machine parts in return for coal and crude oil.  This long-term plan, which gave rise to inflated expectations, proved overly ambitious and was drastically cut back the following year as the PRC was forced to reorder its development priorities and scale down its commitments.  However, the signing of the agreement reflected the wish on both sides to improve relations.

In April 1978, a dispute over the territoriality of the Senkaku Islands (or Diaoyu Islands), a cluster of barren islets north of Taiwan and south of the Ryukyu Islands flared up and threatened to disrupt the developing momentum toward resuming peace treaty talks. Restraint on both sides led to a resolution.

At the end of 1978, the then prime minister Ohira said the government of Japan would offer ODA to China. Official Development Assistance (ODA) from Japan to China began in 1979 and from that time to the present, approximately 3.1331 trillion yen in loan aid (yen loans), 145.7 billion yen in grant aid, and 144.6 billion yen in technical cooperation have been implemented up to June 2005 and has not ended.

Talks on the peace treaty were resumed in July, and the agreement was reached in August on a compromise version of the anti-hegemony clause. The Treaty of Peace and Friendship between Japan and the People's Republic of China was signed on August 12 and came into effect October 23, 1978, under the two leaders of Deng Xiaoping and Fukuda Takeo.

1980s
A "Golden Age" marked by the development of complementary interests flourished from the 1980s to the mid-1990s. Sino-Japanese relations made considerable progress in the 1980s.

The General Secretary of the Chinese Communist Party (CCP), Hu Yaobang, visited Japan in November 1983, and Prime Minister Nakasone reciprocated by visiting the PRC in March 1984.  While Japanese enthusiasm for the Chinese market reached highs and lows, broad strategic considerations in the 1980s steadied Tokyo's policy toward Beijing.  In fact, Japan's heavy involvement in the PRC's economic modernization reflected in part a determination to encourage peaceful domestic development in the PRC, to draw the PRC into gradually expanding links with Japan and the West, and to reduce the PRC's interest in returning to its more provocative foreign policies of the past.

Many of Japan's concerns about the Soviet Union duplicated PRC's worries.  They included the increased deployment in East Asia of Soviet armaments, the growth of the Soviet Pacific fleet, the Soviet invasion of Afghanistan and the potential threat it posed to Persian Gulf oil supply routes, and an increased Soviet military presence in Vietnam. In response, Japan and the PRC adopted notable complementary foreign policies, designed to isolate the Soviet Union and its allies politically and to promote regional stability.

In Southeast Asia, both countries provided strong diplomatic backing for the efforts of the Association of Southeast Asian Nations (ASEAN) to bring about a Vietnamese withdrawal from Cambodia. Japan provided substantial economic assistance to Thailand to help with resettling Indochinese refugees.  The PRC was a key supporter of Thailand and of the Cambodian resistance groups such as the Khmer Rouge.

In Southwest Asia, both nations backed the condemnation of the Soviet occupation of Afghanistan; they refused to recognize the Soviet-backed Kabul regime, and sought through diplomatic and economic means to bolster Pakistan.

In Northeast Asia, Japan and the PRC sought to moderate the behavior of their Korean partners, South Korea and North Korea, to reduce tensions.  In 1983 both the PRC and Japan strongly criticized the Soviet proposal to redeploy some of their armaments to Asia.

Japan encountered a number of episodes of friction with the PRC during the rest of the 1980s. In 1982, a serious political controversy was aroused over a revision of Japanese history textbooks dealing with the war between China and Japan during 1931-45 (cf. Japanese history textbook controversies). In late 1985, Chinese officials complained harshly about Prime Minister Nakasone's visit to the Yasukuni Shrine, which commemorates Japanese soldiers who had died in service of the Emperor some of whom are war criminals. See also China Internet information centre: the issue of Guanghualiao.

Under Prime Minister Nakasone Yasuhiro, the Japanese government reemphasized the relationship to the United States. The U.S. strategic emphasis upon East Asia allegedly shifted the PRC to Japan in 1983. Beijing felt isolation and concerning anew about possible revival of Japanese militarism. By the mid-1983, Beijing had decided coincidentally with its decision to improve relations with the Reagan administration of the United States to solidify ties with Japan.

Economic issues centered on Chinese complaints that the influx of Japanese products into the PRC had produced a serious trade deficit for the PRC.  Nakasone and other Japanese leaders tried to relieve above concerns during visits to Beijing and in other talks with Chinese officials.  They assured the Chinese of Japan's continued large-scale development and commercial assistance, and to obstruct any Sino-Soviet realignment against Japan. The two countries also concluded a bilateral investment treaty in 1988 after seven years of tough negotiation, where China finally agreed to grant Japanese investments with "national treatment".

At the popular level in the PRC, it was not easy to allay concerns.  Student-led demonstrations against Japan (cf. Anti-Japanese sentiment in China), on the one hand, helped reinforce Chinese officials' warnings to their Japanese counterparts.  On the other hand, it was more difficult to change popular opinion in the PRC than it was to change the opinions of the Chinese officials.

Meanwhile, the removal of the General Secretary of the CCP, Hu Yaobang, in 1987 was detrimental to smooth Sino-Japanese relations because Hu had built personal relationships with Nakasone and other Japanese leaders. The PRC government's harsh crackdown on pro-democracy demonstrations in the spring of 1989 caused Japanese policymakers to realize that the new situation in the PRC was extremely delicate and required careful handling to avoid Japanese actions that would push the PRC further away from reforms. Beijing leaders reportedly judged at first that the industrialized countries would relatively quickly resume normal business with the PRC after a brief period of complaint over the Tiananmen Square protests of 1989.  When that did not happen, the PRC officials made strong suggestions to Japanese officials that they break from most industrialized nations by pursuing normal economic intercourse with the PRC, consistent with Tokyo's long-term interests in mainland China.  Japanese leaders like West European and U.S. leaders were careful not to isolate the PRC and continued trade and other relations generally consistent with the policies of other industrialized democracies.  But they also followed the United States lead in limiting economic relations to the PRC.

1990s

Bilateral structural change developed during the late 1990s to 2004. Japan had been investing in the PRC during the early 1990s, and trade decreased during the late 1990s, but resurged at the millennium. The resurgence might have been because of the prospect of the PRC becoming a part of the World Trade Organization (WTO).

2000s
By 2001 China's international trade was the sixth-largest in the world; and over the next several years it was expected to be just under Japan, the fourth largest.

In early 2005, Japan and the United States had issued a joint statement which addresses issues concerning the Taiwan Strait. The PRC was angered by the statement, and protested the interference in its internal affairs. The Anti-Secession Law was passed by the third conference of the 10th National People's Congress of the PRC, and was ratified in March 2005, and then the law went into effect immediately. Subsequently, anti-Japanese demonstrations took place simultaneously in the PRC and other Asian countries.

However, the "warm" relationship between the PRC and Japan had been revived by two Japanese Prime Ministers, Shinzo Abe and particularly Yasuo Fukuda whose father achieved to conclude the Treaty of Peace and Friendship between Japan and the People's Republic of China. In May 2008, Hu Jintao was the first paramount leader of China in over a decade to be invited to Japan on an official visit, and called for increased "co-operation" between the two countries. A "forth" joint statement by Paramount leader Hu Jintao and Japanese Prime Minister Yasuo Fukuda read:

"The two sides resolved to face history squarely, advance toward the future, and endeavor with persistence to create a new era of a "mutually beneficial relationship based on common strategic interests" between Japan and China. They announced that they would align Japan–China relations with the trends of international community and together forge a bright future for the Asia-Pacific region and the world while deepening mutual understanding, building mutual trust, and expanding mutually beneficial cooperation between their nations in an ongoing fashion into the future".

In October 2008, Japanese Prime Minister Aso Taro visited Beijing to celebrate the 30th anniversary of the conclusion of the Treaty of Peace and Friendship between Japan and the People's Republic of China. At the reception, he remarked on his "personal conviction regarding Japan-China relations":

"We should not constrain ourselves in the name of friendship between Japan and China. Rather, sound competition and active cooperation will constitute a true "mutually beneficial relationship based on common strategic interests." Confucius said, "At thirty, I stood firm." In the same way, Japan and China must now stand atop the international stage and work to spread to the rest of the world this spirit of benefiting together".

Although Japanese and Chinese policymakers claimed that "ice-breaking" and "ice-melting" occurred in the bilateral relationship between 2006 and 2010, however, none of the fundamental problems related to history and disputed territory had been resolved, and so there was a virtual "ice-berg" under the surface.

A public opinion poll of the entire population of China conducted by Pew in spring 2008 shows:
 Views toward Japan are especially negative – 69% have an unfavorable opinion of Japan, and a significant number of Chinese (38%) consider Japan an enemy. Opinions of the United States also tend to be negative, and 34% describe the U.S. as an enemy, while just 13% say it is a partner of China. Views about India are mixed at best – 25% say India is a partner, while a similar number (24%) describe it as an enemy....76% of Chinese do not think Japan has apologized sufficiently for its military actions during the 1940s.

2010s: Xi–Abe era
In 2010, China overtook Japan as the world's second-largest economy. In 2012, China's gross GDP was 1.4 times as big as Japan's. In the next three to five years, the Chinese economy is on track to grow to twice the size of Japan's. As a matter of fact, Japan was quite reluctant to witness China's incredible economic growth and therefore had increased its vigilance towards China by viewing China as its biggest threat under then Prime Minister Abe's leadership.

Chinese animosity or even hatred of Japan is reflected in the popular culture. American reporter Howard French states in 2017:
to turn on the television in China is to be inundated with war-themed movies, which overwhelmingly focus on Japanese villainy.  More than 200 anti-Japanese films were produced in 2012 alone, with one scholar calculating that 70% of Chinese TV dramas involved  Japan-related  war plots....A prominent Chinese foreign-policy thinker who has had extensive contact with the country's leadership told me, "in meetings since Xi has been in power [2012] you could feel the hatred.  Everything is about punishing  Japan.  Punishing this damned [Japanese Prime Minister Shinzo] Abe." The most high-profile action that hurt the bilateral relations would be Japanese Prime Ministers’ visits to Yasukuni Shrine, a place considered by most Chinese nationals as offensive because many WWII Japanese military criminals are worshipped there. China-Japan relations reached to the lowest point since the previous Prime Minister Koizumi's term because of his visit to the shrine. Nonetheless, Prime Minister Abe Shinzo also visited Yasukuni Shrine many times after he got re-elected in 2010, which triggered furious anti-Japanese protests in China due to the negative attitudes and perceptions between the two nations. In a sense, both Koizumi and Abe made “maverick behavior”, in specific making visits to the Yasukuni Shrine as the proof to exhibit nationalism ideology, which endangered the China-Japan relations into the worst phase.

2010 Trawler collision

On September 7, 2010, after a Chinese fishing trawler collided with two Japanese Coast Guard patrol boats near the disputed Senkaku Islands, the captain of the trawler, Zhan Qixiong, was arrested by Japanese sailors, sparking tensions. The Japanese government took this action by China as a de facto trade embargo and decided to set aside 53.3 billion yen for the following measures to reduce dependence on Chinese mineral resources:
 ¥19.7BN towards development of rare-earth minerals abroad
 ¥1.6BN towards recycling, urban mining and developing alternative technology by the government and the private sector
 ¥16.3BN towards developing offshore oil and gas in Japan
 ¥8.9BN towards a pre-feasibility study on methane hydrate deposits
 ¥6.8BN towards a study on cobalt rich crust and other undersea reserves
 Cobalt rich crusts are undersea mineral deposits that contain manganese, cobalt, nickel and platinum, as well as rare earths such as neodymium and dysprosium

2011 Japanese White Paper
In 2011, Chinese foreign ministry spokesman Ma Zhaoxu criticized the annual Japanese defense white paper for calling attention to the "China threat theory".

2012- present  Senkaku islands in South China Sea

Both China and Japan claim sovereignty over East China Sea islets that Japan calls the Senkaku Islands and China calls the Diaoyu Islands. Tensions have risen since September 2012, when the Japanese government purchased three of the islets from a private Japanese owner, leading to widespread anti-Japan demonstrations in China. As soon as Japanese government announced Japan's so-called nationalization of the Diaoyu Islands in 2012, China-Japan security relations broke to a freezing point, which triggered a series of military action by Chinese government as countermeasures. Then-Prime Minister Yoshihiko Noda purchased the islets on behalf of the central government to "pre-empt Tokyo Governor Shintaro Ishihara's plan to purchase them with Tokyo municipal funds. Ishihara is well known for his provocative nationalist actions, and Noda feared that Ishihara would try to occupy the islands or otherwise use them to provoke China." Professor Joseph Nye of Harvard University believes Chinese officials chose to ignore Noda's manifest motives, regarding any Japanese government purchase as proof that Japan is trying to disrupt the status quo. In September 2012, General Xu Caihou, vice chairman of the Central Military Commission, said to the Chinese military "prepared for any possible military combat,". Relations deteriorated further after the Japanese government purchase of the Senkaku islands, to the extent that China decided to skip IMF meetings held in Japan. Mass protests against Japanese actions occurred in major Chinese cities. Trade relations deteriorated badly during the latter half of 2012  and Chinese government aircraft intruded into disputed airspace for the first time since 1958.

Richard Katz, editor of The Oriental Economist Report, argues that the Diaoyu/Senkaku island dispute will not reach a critical threshold. "Even though tensions between China and Japan are rising, an economic version of mutual deterrence is preserving the uneasy status quo between the two sides." Katz maintains that China needs Japanese products as much as Japan needs to sell them. "Many of the high-tech products assembled in and exported from China. . .use advanced Japanese-made parts. China could not boycott Japan, let alone precipitate an actual conflict, without stymieing the export-fueled economic miracle that underpins Communist Party rule." Compounded with Washington's commitment to come to Japan's defense, peace will most likely prevail. Japan remains the largest source of foreign investment in China today.

China has sent drones to fly near the islands. Japan has threatened to shoot these down, which China has said would be an act of war.

United States Navy captain James Fanell has used open source official Chinese media sources to argue that China is preparing for a potential short decisive war against Japan to seize the islands.

2013 Japanese White Paper
In its 2013 white paper, Japan called recent Chinese actions "incompatible with international law." The paper also mentioned Operation Dawn Blitz, after China had called for the exercise to be scaled back.

2014 Chinese fighter jets scrambled over East China Sea
Japanese reconnaissance planes and Chinese fighter jets came perilously close in an overlapping disputed airspace over the East China Sea in late May 2014. The incident occurred as China was taking part in joint maritime exercises with Russia. China and Japan each accused the other of causing a potentially dangerous situation. The airspace where the close encounter took place is claimed by both countries as part of their "air defense identification zones." Beijing and Tokyo exchanged protests over the incident.

2014 Baosteel Emotion seizure
In April 2014, China seized a cargo ship, the Baosteel Emotion, over unpaid compensation for two Chinese ships leased in 1936. According to China, the ships were used by the Japanese Army and later sunk. A Chinese court ruled in 2007 that Mitsui O.S.K. Lines, owner of the Baosteel Emotion, had to pay 190 million yuan (approx. US$30.5m) as compensation for the two ships. Mitsui appealed against the decision, but it was upheld in 2012. The Baosteel Emotion was released after three days, when Mitsui paid approximately US$28 million in compensation. Japan has stated that the seizure undermines the Joint Communiqué of the Government of Japan and the Government of the People's Republic of China. The seizure came at a point when tensions over the Senkaku/Diaoyu Islands were running high.

2018 China–United States trade war
Relations between Japan and China have substantially improved in the wake of the China–United States trade war. The improvement has been attributed to strong personal rapport between Abe and Xi, and to Japan's own trade disputes with the United States. Abe has advised Xi on trade negotiations with U.S. president Donald Trump.

COVID-19 pandemic (2019-present) 
China-Japanese relations have experienced a thaw due to novel coronavirus outbreak (2019-present) that emerged from Wuhan, with an ancient line of a poem by a Japanese emperor to a Chinese monk that inspired the latter to spread Buddhism to Japan: "Even though we live in different places, we live under the same sky" being tweeted out by government officials and with the stanza posted on the sides of boxes of face masks sent as aid to China. Japan's private sector has donated over 3 million face masks along with $6.3 million in monetary donation. China's Foreign Minister Geng Shuang lauded Japan for their support.

Amidst the spread of COVID-19 pandemic in Japan, China responded in kind by donating 12,500 COVID-19 test kits in aid to Japan after reports that the country was running low on test kits, with a Chinese Foreign Ministry spokesperson saying in Japanese that "China and Japan are neighboring countries separated by only a narrow strip of water. There are no borders in fight against the spread of virus."

Japan also donated 1.24 million doses of COVID-19 vaccines to Taiwan on 4 June 2021. This prompted a wave of gratitude from Taiwanese people, whereas the Chinese Communist Party condemned Japan's move.

Chinese missiles in Japan's EEZ 
On August 4, 2022, following 2022 visit by Nancy Pelosi to Taiwan, China conducted “precision missile strikes” in the ocean near Taiwan of which 5 missiles landed in Japan's Exclusive Economic Zone. Japanese Defense Minister Nobuo Kishi protested the missiles as “serious threats to Japan’s national security and the safety of the Japanese people.”

Official Development Assistance

Japan's Official Development Assistance (ODA) to China began in 1979 after the Treaty of Peace and Friendship between Japan and China signed in 1978. From 1979 to 2013, Japan has provided 24 billion USD in loan aid and 7.7 billion dollars in grant aid including 6.6 billion in technical cooperation, a total of US$32 billion. Even in 2013, Japan still provided US$296 million loan and US$30 million grant.

Bilateral sensitive issues
The Ministry of Foreign Affairs of the PRC points out some sensitive issues between Japan and the PRC:
 Issue of history
 Issue of Taiwan
 Issue of Diaoyu Islands/Senkaku Islands
 Issue of Japanese-American security co-operation
 Issue of war reparations
 Japanese chemical weapons discarded in China

As Iechika and many others point out, the fundamental concerns of the China-Japanese relations has been the issues of history and Taiwan. Therefore, this article describes the above two issues in the following.

Issue of history

The PRC joined other Asian countries, such as South Korea and North Korea, in criticizing Japanese history textbooks that whitewash Japanese war crimes in World War II. They claimed that the rise of militarism became evident in Japanese politics. Much anti-Japanese sentiment has raised, and this has been exacerbated by burgeoning feelings of Chinese nationalism and former Prime Minister Junichiro Koizumi's visits to the Yasukuni Shrine. Although Koizumi openly declared– in a statement made on April 22, 2005, in Jakarta– "deep remorse" over Japan's wartime crimes (the latest in a series of apologies spanning several decades), many Chinese observers regard the apology as insufficient and not backed up by sincere action.

There also remains the dispute over the Senkaku Islands (Diaoyu Islands), which resulted in clashes between Taiwanese (Chinese) protesters and the Japanese government in April 2005. The incident led to anti-Japanese protests and sporadic violence across the PRC, from Beijing to Shanghai, later Guangzhou, Shenzhen and Shenyang. In August 2012, Hong Kong activists landed on one of the disputed Diaoyu/Senkaku Islands, and Japanese nationalists responded by landing on the island the following week. The incidents sparked the largest-scale anti-Japanese protests in China for decades in which protesters vandalized Japanese shops and cars. On the 14th of September relations deteriorated even further in response to Japan's announcement of plans to buy the island from its private owners. The news resulted in the Chinese government sending six surveillance ships to the island and further anti-Japanese protests in which protesters attacked the Japanese embassies in Shanghai and Beijing.

The PRC and Japan continue to debate over the actual number of people killed in the Rape of Nanking. The PRC claims that at least 300,000 civilians were murdered while Japan claims a far less figure of 40,000-200,000.  While a majority of Japanese believe in the existence of the massacre, a Japanese-produced documentary film released just prior to the 60th anniversary of the massacre, titled The Truth about Nanjing, denies that any such atrocities took place. These disputes have stirred up enmity against Japan from the global Chinese community.

Many Japanese believe that China is using the issue of the countries' checkered history, such as the Japanese history textbook controversies, and official visits to the Yasukuni Shrine, as both a diplomatic card and a tool to make Japan a scapegoat in domestic Chinese politics.

Japan's compensation
From late 19th century to early 20th century, one of the many factors contributing to the bankruptcy of the Qing government was Japan's requirement for large amount of war reparations. China paid huge amounts of silver to Japan under various treaties, including the Sino-Japanese Friendship and Trade Treaty (1871), Treaty of Shimonoseki (1895), the Triple Intervention (1895) and the Boxer Protocol (1901).  After the First Sino-Japanese War in 1894–95, the Qing government paid a total of 200,000,000 taels of silver to Japan for reparations.

The Second Sino-Japanese War 1936-1945 also caused huge economic losses to China.  However, Chiang Kai-shek waived reparations claims for the war when the ROC concluded the Treaty of Taipei with Japan in 1952. Similarly, when Japan normalized its relations with the PRC in 1972, Mao Zedong waived the claim of war reparations from Japan.

Ex-Japanese Prime Minister Hatoyama Yukio offered personal apology for Japan's wartime crimes, especially the Nanking Massacre, "As a Japanese citizen, I feel that it's my duty to apologise for even just one Chinese civilian killed brutally by Japanese soldiers and that such action cannot be excused by saying that it occurred during war."

Issue of Taiwan

The Japan–Taiwan official split is one of the fundamental principles of China-Japanese relations. The PRC emphasises Taiwan is a part of China and the PRC is the only legal government of China (cf. One-China policy). By the 1972 agreement, the Treaty of Taipei was argued to be invalid.

When the PRC–Japan normalization was concerned, the PRC had been worried about some Japanese pro-Taiwan independence politicians. At the same time, the Treaty of Mutual Cooperation and Security between the United States and Japan has been a big problem for the PRC. In a point of the PRC's view, the military alliance treaty implicitly directs to the Taiwan Strait. It has become a big factor for Taiwan security affairs.

On 2 December 2021, the Chinese Ministry of Foreign Affairs announced that it had summoned Japan's ambassador in Beijing, Hideo Tarumi, over remarks made by Japanese Prime Minister Shinzo Abe on 1 December 2021 in support of Taiwan. In comments attributed to Chinese Deputy Foreign Minister. Hua Chunying, Beijing said Tokyo's envoy had been summoned over Abe's "irresponsible" remarks which presented a "brutal intervention" in China's internal affairs.

On 28 December 2021, both Japan and China agreed to set up a military hotline to defuse potential crises over disputed islands and the Taiwan Strait.

Human rights
In July 2019, the UN ambassadors from 22 nations, including Japan, signed a joint letter to the UNHRC condemning China's mistreatment of the Uyghurs as well as of other minority groups, urging the Chinese government to close the Xinjiang re-education camps.

On 6 October 2020, a group of 39 countries, including Japan, the U.S., most of the EU member states, Albania, Canada, Haiti, Honduras, Australia and New Zealand, made a statement to denounce China for its treatment of ethnic minorities and for curtailing freedoms in Hong Kong.

Environmental Conditions and Policy

East Asia as a region suffers from various environmental problems, including pollution and emissions, which directly impact global warming and climate change. Much of the environmental damage can be traced back to economic growth. China and Japan are top economic powers in the region and as a result, they have greatly contributed to East Asia's environmental crisis. Even still, the nations rank much differently in sustainability outputs, as China currently sits at #120 on the Environmental Performance Index (EPI) while Japan is at #12.

China, due to being the most populated country in the world, currently leads in air and water pollution, but it also suffers from desertification. Producing 10.06 billion tons annually, China also contributes most to  emissions. China also suffers from desertification, in which habitable land turns into desert. 20% of China's land is now desert and this number will continue to steadily increase.

China knows it must make changes to preserve its nation and the world. As a result, its government signed the Paris Agreement in which they pledge to hit peak carbon emissions by 2030 and have renewables account for 20% of its energy. China has also adopted the use of clean energy and has passed new laws and regulations that require companies to start adopting the use of clean energy and the ability to punish polluters. Most recently, China has released a new plan, the “China Standards 2035,” which is designed at influencing next-generation technologies that encourage climate neutrality and environmental conservation.

Japan dramatically improved its economy in the mid-1900s under the developmental state model, which drastically harmed the environment. The Ministry of International Trade and Industry produced policy at the national level to promote certain environmental guidelines, but much of the work early on started at the local levels. This was because the local governments could be held more accountable for their actions directly by the people. More recently, Japan has joined the Paris Climate Agreement to commit to sustainability efforts. This includes a goal for carbon neutrality by 2050, in hopes of moving Japan out of the top five -emitting nations.

Japan also aims to reinvent the Japanese economy, viewing sustainable development as an opportunity, not as an obstacle. Japanese leaders hope to work closely with various international figures, including with Chinese leaders, to make policy changes that can slow global warming and prevent further climate change.

Public perception of relations

Due to historical grievances and present geopolitical disagreements, relations between the Japanese and Chinese people are generally one of mutual hostility. According to a 2014 BBC World Service Poll, 3% of Japanese people view China's influence positively, with 73% expressing a negative view, the most negative perception of China in the world, while 5% of Chinese people view Japanese influence positively, with 90% expressing a negative view, the most negative perception of Japan in the world. A 2014 survey conducted by the Pew Research Center showed 85% of Japanese were concerned that territorial disputes between China and neighbouring countries could lead to a military conflict.

However, about 64.2% of Chinese citizens think that the status of the bilateral relationship with Japan is bad, compared to 44.9%, the percentage of Japanese citizens who hold the same view. This is a significant drop compared to 2016, where 78.2% and 71.9% of Chinese and Japanese citizens, respectively, held a negative perception of the relationship. The perception of the future of these ties has also gotten better, with 29.7% and 23.6% of Chinese and Japanese citizens, again respectively, expecting relations to worsen, and 28.7% and 13.1% predicting that the relations will get better. The improving view of the status of China–Japan relations has been attributed to more communication between political leaders, a lack of "big issues", and the overshadowing of problems in the relationship by problems with North Korea.

A 2019 survey published by the Pew Research Center found that 85% of Japanese people had an unfavourable view of China, while 75% of Chinese people had an unfavourable view of Japan.

The Economist has written that according to a survey done in 2021, more than 40% of Japanese aged 18-29 feel an "affinity" towards China, compared to only 13% for those aged in their 60s and 70s.

Genron NPO-China International Press Group polling 
A private Japanese organisation, Genron NPO, and a Chinese media group, China International Press Group Limited, conducted the poll. It has been conducted jointly every year since 2005. The purpose of the survey is to continuously monitor the state of mutual understanding and recognition between the people of the two countries and how it has changed.

2020 
The poll on the Japanese side was conducted between 12 September and 4 October using the door-to-door retention collection method among men and women aged 18 and over throughout Japan, with a valid sample size of 1,000. The gender of respondents was 48.6% male and 51.4% female. 2.5% were under 20 years of age, 11.8% were aged 20-29, 14.9% were aged 30-39, 17.4% were aged 40-49, 14.6% were aged 50-59, and 38.8% were aged 60 and over. 6.6% had a final education below the middle school, 47.5% graduated from high school, 21.3% from junior college or technical college, 22.3% from university and 0.9% from postgraduate studies.

In contrast, the Chinese public opinion survey was conducted from 15 September to 16 October in 10 cities - Beijing, Shanghai, Guangzhou, Chengdu, Shenyang, Wuhan, Nanjing, Xi'an, Qingdao and Zhengzhou - among men and women aged 18 and over, using the interview method. The validly collected sample was 1571. The gender of respondents was 49.6% male and 50.4% female. 2.7% were under 20 years of age, 21.8% were aged 20-29, 28% were aged 30-39, 24.3% were aged 40-49, 12.3% were aged 50-59, and 10.8% were aged 60 and over. 11.3% had a final education below the secondary school, 27.1% graduated from high school or vocational high school, 32.5% from vocational school, 26.1% from university, 0.5% from double degree and 2.2% from postgraduate studies.

Among Japanese, those with a 'not good' impression of China have turned around from an improving trend over the past few years to a worsening one, with 89.7%, an increase of 5 percentage points from last year to nearly 90%. Those with a 'good' impression of China also decreased by 5 points to 10%.

In contrast, 45.2% of Chinese respondents have a 'good' impression of Japan, maintaining almost the same level as in 2019, when the figure was the highest since the survey began.

The most common reason for Japanese having a 'good' impression of China is 'because I am interested in China's ancient culture and history' (30%), followed by 'because Chinese people have become closer to me due to the increase in tourists and various private exchanges', which was the most common reason in 2019, down from 40% last year to 29%.

As for the reasons why the Chinese have a 'good' impression of Japan, 'because the Japanese are polite, respectful of manners and have a high level of civilisation' stood out at 56.8%, significantly higher than last year's 44.6%.

On the other hand, the most common reasons why Japanese people have a 'bad' impression of China are China's recent behaviour, with 57.4% citing 'aggression around the Senkaku Islands' and 47.3% citing 'China's actions in the South China Sea and elsewhere', as well as 'discomfort with the political system of one-party rule by the Communist Party at 47%, each of which is higher than 2019. The percentage of respondents who said they were "uncomfortable with the political system of one-party rule of the Communist Party" was higher than in 2019.

The reason why the Chinese have a 'bad' impression of Japan is the same as in 2019, with 'no proper apology and remorse for the history of aggression' leading the list at over 70%, followed by the 'nationalisation of the Diaoyu islands'.

2022 
The Japanese poll was conducted between July 23 and August 14, using the door-to-door retention collection method among men and women aged 18 and up throughout Japan, with a proper sample size of 1000. The respondents were 48.3% male and 50.9% female. 2.3% were under the age of 20, 11.9% were 20-29, 14.8% were 30-39, 17.3% were 40-49, 14.7% were 50-59, 16.9% were 60-69, and 22.1% were 70-79. Regarding final education, 5.5% have a secondary school education or less, 42% have a high school education, 21.5% have a junior college or technical college education, 28% have a university education, and 1.2% have a postgraduate education.

The Chinese public opinion survey, on the other hand, was conducted using the interview method in ten cities - Beijing, Shanghai, Guangzhou, Chengdu, Shenyang, Wuhan, Nanjing, Xi'an, Qingdao, and Zhengzhou - from 23 July to 30 September among men and women aged 18 and over. The total number of validly collected samples was 1528. The gender split was 51% male and 49% female. 2.4% were under 20 years of age, 22.1% were aged 20-29, 21.5% were aged 30-39, 24.3% were aged 40-49, 14.3% were aged 50-59, 14.5% were aged 60-69 and 0.8% were aged 70-79. 8% had a final education below the secondary school, 22.4% graduated from high school, vocational high school, junior college or vocational school, 27.6% were currently studying at university, 37.7% had a university degree, 0.9% had a double degree, and 3.4% had a postgraduate degree.

The number of Japanese who have a 'poor' impression of China has decreased slightly since 2021 but is still at 87.3%.

The number of Chinese who have a 'poor' impression of Japan has decreased since 2021 but is still over 60% at 62.6%.

The most common reasons for the Japanese having a 'good' impression of China are 'China's ancient culture and history' and 'China's sightseeing spots and magnificent nature'.

As for the reasons why Chinese people have a 'good' impression of Japan, the most common response was 'the quality of Japanese products is high', followed by 'because Japan has achieved economic development and the people have a high standard of living'. Also, reasons such as  'the Japanese are polite, respectful of manners and have a high level of civilisation' at around 50%.

On the other hand, the most common reason for Japanese people having a 'bad' impression of China is China's 'aggression around the Senkaku Islands' at 58.9%, followed by 'I feel uncomfortable with the political system' at 51.5%.

The most common reason for the Chinese having a 'bad' impression of Japan is that Japan 'has not properly apologised and reflected on its history of aggression' at 78.8%, nearly 80%, followed by 'caused conflict by nationalising the area around the Diaoyu Islands' at 58.9%. Notable increases from last year were 'inappropriate words and actions of some politicians' (from 21% to 37.7%), 'Japan is trying to encircle China in terms of military, economy and ideology in cooperation with the US' (from 23% to 37.6%), 'Japanese media propagates the threat of China' (from 11.8% to (from 11.8% to 34.2%) and 'Japan is showing a negative attitude towards one China' (from 11.2% to 26.5%).

VIP inter-visits

See also

 Anti-Japanese sentiment in China
 Anti-Chinese sentiment in Japan
 2005 anti-Japanese demonstrations
 2012 China anti-Japanese demonstrations
 China–Japan–South Korea trilateral summit
 Foreign relations of China
 Foreign relations of Japan
 Japan–Taiwan relations
 East China Sea
 Senkaku Islands
 Ryukyu independence movement
 Exclusive economic zone#Japan
 Comfort women
 Japanese war crimes
 Nanjing Massacre
 Nanjing Massacre denial
 Japanese history textbook controversies
 Pan-Asianism
 Five kings of Wa
 Himiko
 Xu Fu
 Japan China Trade Agreement 1974

References

Further reading 

 Barnouin, Barbara & Yu Changgen. Chinese Foreign Policy during the Cultural Revolution, (Columbia University Press, 1998).
 Beasley, William G. Japanese Imperialism, 1894-1945 (Oxford University Press, 1987).
 Berger, Thomas U., Mike M. Mochizuki & Jitsuo Tsuchiyama, eds. Japan in International Politics: The Foreign Policies of an Adaptive State (Lynne Rienner, 2007)
 Chung, Chien-peng. Contentious Integration: Post-Cold War Japan-China Relations in the Asia-Pacific (Routledge, 2016).
 Dent, Christopher M., ed. China, Japan and Regional Leadership in East Asia (Edward Elgar, 2008)
 Dreyer, June Teufel. Middle Kingdom and Empire of the Rising Sun: Sino-Japanese Relations, Past and Present, (Oxford University Press, 2016)
 Drifte, Reinhard Japan's Security Relations with China since 1989: From Balancing to Bandwagoning? (Routledge, 2002)
 Emmott, Bill.  Rivals: How the Power Struggle between China, India and Japan Will Shape Our Next Decade, (Harcourt, 2008)
 Hagström, Linus. Japan's China Policy: A Relational Power Analysis, (Routledge, 2005)
 Hunt, Michael H. The Genesis of Chinese Communist Foreign Policy, (Columbia University Press, 1996)
 Iechika, Ryoko. Nittchu kankei no kihon kozo: Futatsu no mondaiten/kokonotsu no kettei jiko [The Fundamental Structure of Sino-Japanese Relations: Two Problems, Nine Matters Decided], (Koyo Shobo, 2003)
 Iriye, Akira. China and Japan in the Global Setting, (Harvard University Press, 1992)

 Jansen, Marius B. Japan and China: From War to Peace, 1894-1972 (Rand McNally, 1975).
 Jin, Xide. 21 Seiki no Nittchu kankei [Sino-Japanese Relations of the 21st Century], (Nihon Chohosha, 2004)
 Kawashima, Yutaka. Japanese Foreign Policy at the Crossroads: Challenges and Options for the Twenty-First Century, (Brookings Institution Press, 2003)
 Keene, Donald. "The Sino-Japanese War of 1894-95 and Its Cultural Effects in Japan." in  Donald H. Shively, Tradition and Modernization in Japanese Culture (Princeton University Press, 1971)
 King, Amy. China-Japan Relations after World War Two: Empire, Industry and War, 1949–1971 (Cambridge University Press, 2016).
 Kokubun, Ryosei, et al. eds. Japan–China Relations in the Modern Era. (Routledge, 2017).
 Kokubun, Ryosei. Japan–China Relations through the Lens of Chinese Politics. (Japan Publishing Industry Foundation for Culture, 2021).
 
 Licheng, Ma. Hatred Has No Future: New Thinking on Relations with Japan (Japan Publishing Industry Foundation for Culture, 2020).
 Lone, Stewart Japan's First Modern War: Army and Society in the Conflict with China, 1894-5 (Springer, 1994).
 Nish, Ian. "An Overview of Relations between China and Japan, 1895–1945." China Quarterly (1990) 124 (1990): 601–623. online
 Ogata, Sadako. Normalization with China: A Comparative Study of U.S. and Japanese Processes, (University of California, 1988).
 O'Hanlon, Michael E.  The Senkaku Paradox: Risking Great Power War Over Small Stakes (Brookings Institution, 2019) online review
 Paine, Sarah C.M. The Sino-Japanese War of 1894-1895: Perceptions, Power, and Primacy (Cambridge UP, 2005.)
 Reinhold, Christiane. Studying the Enemy: Japan Hands in Republican China and Their Quest for National Identity, 1925-1945 (Routledge, 2018).
 Rose, Caroline.  Interpreting history in Sino-Japanese Relations: A Case Study in Political Decision Making (Routledge, 1998)
 Rose, Caroline. Sino-Japanese Relations: Facing the Past, Looking to the Future? (Routledge, 2005) 
 Rose, Caroline. "Breaking the Deadlock: Japan's Informal Diplomacy with China, 1958-9." in  Iokibe Makoto et al. eds. Japanese Diplomacy in the 1950s: From Isolation to Integration (Routledge, 2008)
 Schaller, Michael. Altered States: The United States and Japan since the Occupation (Oxford University Press, 1997)   excerpt "China and Japan" pp 77–96.
 Schultz, Franziska. Economic Effects of Political Shocks to Sino-Japanese Relations (2005-2014) (Springer Fachmedien Wiesbaden GmbH, 2019).
 Söderberg, Marie. Chinese-Japanese Relations in the Twenty-first Century: Complementarity and Conflict, (Routledge, 2002)
 Thorne, Christopher G. The Limits of Foreign Policy: The West, the League and the Far Eastern Crisis of 1931-1933 (1972) online
 Vogel, Ezra F., Yuan Ming & Tanaka Akihiko [eds.]  The Golden Age of the US-China-Japan Triangle, 1972-1989, (Harvard University Press, 2003)
 Vogel, Ezra F. China and Japan: Facing History (2019)  excerpt scholarly survey over 1500 years
 Wan, Ming. Sino-Japanese Relations: Interaction, Logic, and Transformation  (2006) online review
 Wei, Shuge. News under Fire: China's Propaganda against Japan in the English-Language Press, 1928–1941 (Hong Kong University Press, 2017).
 Whiting, Allen S. China Eyes Japan, (University of California Press, 1989) 
 Wits, Casper. "The Japan Group: Managing China's People's Diplomacy Toward Japan in the 1950s." East Asia 33.2 (2016): 91–110.
 Yoshida, Takashi. The Making of the 'Rape of Nanking': History and Memory in Japan, China, and the United States (Oxford University Press, 2006)  excerpt.
 Zhao, Quansheng. Japanese Policymaking: The Politics behind Politics: Informal Mechanisms & the Making of China Policy, [New Ed.] (Oxford University Press, 1996)

External links

 Ministry of Foreign Affairs of the People's Republic of China: Japan
 Ministry of Foreign Affairs of Japan: Japan-China Relations

 
Japan
China
Relations of colonizer and former colony